Route 152 is a state highway in the U.S. states of Rhode Island and Massachusetts. The highway begins at U.S. Route 1A (US 1A) and Route 114 in East Providence, Rhode Island. After crossing into Massachusetts, Route 152 runs  through Seekonk, Attleboro, and North Attleboro to US 1 in Plainville.

Route description
Route 152 begins at the Rhode Island state line in the town of Seekonk; the state line is just east of the Ten Mile River, which is impounded as Central Pond to the north and James V. Turner Reservoir to the south. Newman Avenue continues west into East Providence as Rhode Island Route 152, which has its terminus at US 1A and Rhode Island Route 114 (Pawtucket Street). Route 152 crosses the East Junction Branch of the Providence and Worcester Railroad before meeting the eastern end of Brook Street; Brook Street is unsigned Route 15, which becomes Rhode Island Route 15 west of the state line in Pawtucket. The highway intersects Central Avenue within the community of North Seekonk and assumes that name before paralleling the Ten Mile River into Attleboro, where the highway follows the city's Main Street. Just north of the city line, Route 152 crosses over Amtrak's Northeast Corridor and passes to the east of the Hebronville Mill Historic District.

Route 152 crosses over the railroad again south of downtown and passes under the railroad next to the Attleboro station on the Massachusetts Bay Transit Authority's Providence/Stoughton Line in downtown Attleboro. In the center of town, the highway intersects Route 123, which heads southwest as County Street and east as Park Street to its junction with Route 118. Route 152 leaves the downtown area by crossing the Bungay River, at which the highway passes the historic Blackinton Houses and Park. Just south of the boundary between Attleboro and North Attleboro, the highway intersects Robert Toner Boulevard, which has an interchange with Interstate 95 (I-95) immediately to the west. Route 152 is named Kelley Boulevard as it passes through the town of North Attleboro, where the highway crosses over I-95. The highway intersects Route 106 (Messenger Street) just after crossing the Bristol–Norfolk county line and entering the town of Plainville. Route 152 follows Taunton Street north to its terminus at an oblique intersection with US 1 (Washington Street) just south of the U.S. Highway's interchange with I-495. Taunton Avenue continues north as a municipal highway toward Wrentham.

Major intersections

References

External links

2019 Highway Map, Rhode Island

152
152
Transportation in Bristol County, Massachusetts
Transportation in Norfolk County, Massachusetts